Stinkingwater Creek is a stream in the U.S. state of South Dakota. It is a tributary of Belle Fourche River.

Stinkingwater Creek was named for the naturally occurring unpleasant odor along its course.

See also
List of rivers of South Dakota

References

Rivers of Butte County, South Dakota
Rivers of Lawrence County, South Dakota
Rivers of South Dakota